Saleh Khani (also Romanized as Şāleḩ Khānī; also known as Kalāteh-ye Şāleḩ Khānī) is a village in Pain Velayat Rural District, Razaviyeh District, Mashhad County, Razavi Khorasan Province, Iran. At the 2006 census, its population was 72, in 18 families.

References 

Populated places in Mashhad County